Edgewater Village Hall is a historic former village hall situated within Tappen Park, a public park located in Stapleton, Staten Island, New York.  The village hall was built in 1889 for the village of Edgewater, which was dissolved nine years later with the consolidation of New York City. The building is a -story, T-shaped building with a square tower and slate-covered hipped roof in the Romanesque Revival style, now used for municipal offices.  The park dates to 1867 and provides a dramatic setting for the village hall.

It was added to the National Register of Historic Places in 1980.

References

Former villages in New York City
Government buildings on the National Register of Historic Places in New York City
Romanesque Revival architecture in New York (state)
Government buildings completed in 1889
Government buildings in Staten Island
National Register of Historic Places in Staten Island
City and town halls on the National Register of Historic Places in New York (state)
Stapleton Heights, Staten Island